Alfonzo J. Giordano Jr. (February 7, 1937 - November 21, 2013) was a senior ranking officer in the Philadelphia Police Department (PPD), having achieved the rank of Inspector before his retirement in 1982. In 1986, he was convicted of accepting $57,000 in bribes.  Giordano admitted receiving more than $45,000 in bribes in 1979, and more than $12,000 in early 1980 when he was commander of Philadelphia's East Division.  The payoffs were from various operators of illegal lotteries and from sports betting operations that thrived in the blue collar neighborhoods.  

Giordano is notable as being the "right hand man" of Frank Rizzo. He maintained a position of a high-ranking officer in the department throughout Rizzo's tenure as police commissioner and mayor. He was a member of the police force during the summer of 1964 when race riots devoured much of the city.

References 

1937 births
2013 deaths
People from Philadelphia
American police detectives
Philadelphia Police Department officers
American people of Italian descent
American people convicted of bribery
Police officers convicted of accepting bribes
American police officers convicted of crimes